Dinjan (or Dinjoy gaon) is a small township in Dibrugarh district of Assam, India. It is located in the tea growing area of Assam. The closest town to it is Tinsukia. During World War II, nearby Dinjan Airfield was used by transport aircraft which carried supplies over The Hump to Kunming, China for the Chinese army.

Geography

Location
National Highway 37 passes through Dinjan.

Getting There
The nearest major railway station to Dinjan is Tinsukia (NTSK) which is at a distance of 12.5 kilometres. The nearest airport is at Mohanbari, Dibrugarh which is at a distance of 45 kilometres.

References

External links
 About Dinjan
 Satellite map of Dinjan

Cities and towns in Dibrugarh district